This is a list of the 300 Major League Baseball players who have hit the most home runs. 

In the sport of baseball, a home run is a hit in which the batter scores by circling all the bases and reaching home plate in one play, without the benefit of a fielding error. This can be accomplished either by hitting the ball out of play while it is still in fair territory (a conventional home run), or by an inside-the-park home run.

Barry Bonds holds the Major League Baseball home run record with 762. He passed Hank Aaron, who hit 755, on August 7, 2007. The only other players to have hit 700 or more are Babe Ruth with 714 and Albert Pujols with 703. Alex Rodriguez (696), Willie Mays (660), Ken Griffey Jr. (630), Jim Thome (612), and Sammy Sosa (609) are the only other players to have hit 600 or more.

Listed are all Major League Baseball players with 223 or more home runs hit during official regular-season games (i.e., excluding playoffs or exhibition games). Players in bold face are active as of the 2022 Major League Baseball season (including free agents), with the number in parenthesis designating the number of home runs they have hit during the 2022 season. The last change in the cutoff for the top 300 occurred on September 11, 2022, when Eugenio Suarez hit his 223rd career home run, displacing Jason Bay and Don Mattingly.

Key

List
Stats updated as of the end of the 2022 season.

See also

500 home run club

List of Major League Baseball annual home run leaders

List of Major League Baseball progressive career home runs leaders

List of Major League Baseball single-game home run leaders

Notes

References
MLB Official Career Home Run List
Career Leaders & Records for Home Runs

Home run leaders, top 500
Major League Baseball statistics